Aaron Marsh is an American musician and record producer from Lakeland, Florida. He first gained prominence as the lead singer, guitarist and pianist for the Florida-based indie rock band Copeland, who formed in 2000. Marsh has since gone on to numerous production projects, co-producing his own band's studio albums usually along with either Matt Goldman or Aaron Sprinkle. Marsh also has worked as a film composer in narrative film, as well as advertising. His credits include the 2013 film Worm, the 2014 film A Bottle's Odyssey, and the 2018 film Shed.

Marsh produced Anchor and Braille's debut album: Felt, which was released on August 4, 2009. Marsh's production was praised by both AbsolutePunk and Alternative Press in their reviews of the album.

Early life and education 
Aaron Marsh was born in Eugene, Oregon.

When he was a year old, Marsh moved to Lakeland, FL. Marsh attended Harrison School for the Arts where he practiced musical theory and trombone. While there, he formed the band evAngel with bassist and backup singer James Likeness and Thomas Blair on guitar.

In 2001, Marsh attended Florida Southern College where he and Likeness formed the now-named Copeland. Guitarists Bryan Laurenson (who took the place of Blair in 2002), and his brother Stephen (joined in late 2007), along with drummer Jon Bucklew (who took the place of Rusty Fuller, who was replaced after appearing on 2003's rookie full-length, Beneath Medicine Tree).

Music career

2001–2010: Copeland 
Aaron Marsh and Bryan Laurenson signed a record deal with the independent label The Militia Group in 2002 and released their first album, Beneath Medicine Tree, a year later. They would go on to release In Motion (2005), Eat Sleep Repeat (2006), Dressed Up and In Line (2007), You Are My Sunshine (2008).

After the release of their 2008 record, You Are My Sunshine, Marsh announced that the group would be taking an indefinite hiatus. Marsh stated on Copeland's MySpace page "We have come to an extremely difficult decision. It has come time for us to move on from Copeland and follow other paths in our lives. We are absolutely grateful to have been able to make music for as long as we have. In the last 9 years we've been able to see parts of the world that we never dreamt we would see. We have shared the stage and built friendships with immensely talented artists. We've been afforded the opportunity to make 4 records that we're extremely proud of. Most of all, we feel honored that people have cared so much for our band and for our art. We appreciate every listener who has allowed our music to be a part of their lives. We want to offer our deepest thanks to every individual who has supported us on this ride. It has profoundly impacted our lives." They completed their record cycle with a Farewell Tour throughout the  beginning of 2010.

2014–current: Copeland 
In 2014, the band announced they would be reuniting including a new record deal with Tooth & Nail Records, along with their 5th full-length album, Ixora. Their announcement stated that the record would be recorded and produced by Aaron Marsh at his studio in Lakeland, FL, The Vanguard Room.

The band would go on to release Blushing in 2019. Blushing is the sixth studio album by American band Copeland. It was released on Valentine's Day 2019 via Tooth & Nail Records. It is the band's follow-up to their 2014 album Ixora, as well as their second album released since their reunion. On the record, Marsh is attribute to lead vocals, backing vocals, piano (all tracks except "It Felt So Real"), synthesizer, programming (all tracks except "Suddenly"), Mellotron ("Suddenly", "Colorless"), guitar ("As Above, So Alone", "Colorless", "Strange Flower"), bass guitar (all tracks except "On Your Worst Day" and "It Felt So Real"), trombone ("Suddenly", "Colorless"), drums ("Night Figures"), percussion ("Suddenly", "Skywriter", "Colorless", "Strange Flower", "Waltz on Water").

Marsh is slated to release his 7th album on September 16, 2022 titled “Revolving Doors”, an orchestral best-of album with ten of Copeland's most popular songs with a full symphony orchestra as the centerpiece. The album was recorded at Blackbird Studios and Oceanway in Nashville, and will be accompanied by a live show on September 17, 2022 at the Caverns in Pelham, TN.

2011: The Lulls in Traffic 
In 2011, Marsh began a new project titled The Lulls in Traffic, releasing their first video June 2011. He has defined his role in the band as front-man, and has produced tracks while collaborating with Russian/Los Angeles lyricist and visual artist Ivan Ives. He calls it his "skewed view" of underground hip-hop. Their album Rabbit in the Snare, which features guest appearances from Talib Kweli and Ceschi, is available on vinyl, CD, and all streaming platforms.

2021: GLASWING 
In 2021, Marsh began a solo project under the name “Glaswing”. The debut album, I'm in the Checkout Line of My Life / Like Water on a Glass Table is full of lo-fi electronic soundscapes beneath Aaron Marsh's signature delicate voice and emotional songwriting.

Style and influences 
Marsh has attributed much of his early music influence to the local music scene, naming bands like Divine Child (AKA Denison Marrs), Pilots V Aeroplanes, and, yes, Nora's Breakfast Club. He states that Radiohead is his favorite band "of all time". Some of his non-indie rock influences that he pulled from for The Lulls in Traffic record were Madlib, Dilla, Squarepusher and Aphex Twin.

Vocal contributions
Marsh has contributed guest vocals on a variety of songs.
"Heaven or Hell" on the Morning Of's album The Way I Fell In
"The Right Time" on Denison Marrs' album Denison Marrs
"Some Will Seek Forgiveness, Others Escape" on Underoath's album They're Only Chasing Safety
"Inevitable" on Anberlin's album Cities
"Empty Bottles" on Stacy Clark's album Apples & Oranges
"Hospital" on Lydia's album Illuminate
"Photographs" on Lakes' Photographs EP
"Forget Love, I Just Want You to Make Sense to Me Tonight." on Anchor & Braille's album Felt
"Bittersweet Symphony" cover by Ace Enders and a Million Different People
"The Worst Of Your Wear" on Fair (band)'s album Disappearing World
"Let Love Bleed Red" on Sleeping With Sirens' album With Ears to See and Eyes to Hear
"Turn It On" on the Cinema's album Talking In Your Sleep (2014)
"Gold Dust" on Emarosa's album Versus Reimagined - EP (2015)
"Cynical" on Propaganda's album Crooked (2017)

Production credits
(P - Producer | E - Engineer | M - Mixing | W - Writing)
Copeland - In Motion (P/W)
The Myriad - You Can't Trust A Ladder (P)
Pemberley - I'm Fine (P/E/M)
Estates - Be Fair (P/E/W)
Woodale - Don't Say It Too Late (E/M)
Anchor&Braille - Felt (P/E/M/W)
Copeland - Eat, Sleep, Repeat (P/W)
Summerbirds In the Cellar - Druids (E)
Lydia - Illuminate (E/W)
Nikki Kummerow - Firecracker (P/E/M)
Person L - The Positives (P/E)
Copeland - You Are My Sunshine (P/E/W)
Our Family Name - Begin At The Beginning (P/E)
Poema - Once A Year: A Poema Christmas EP (P/E/M)
Holly Ann - Ravens (P/E/M)
Radial - Una Dia Extrano (P/E/M)
Andrew Shearin - Have Hope, Have Heart EP (M) 
Author - People Are Alike All Over EP (P/E/M)
Joshua Michael Robinson - Intentions (P/E/M)
Fairground - Fairground EP" (P/E/M)
Valaska - Natural Habitat (P/E/M)
Ivan Ives - Stranger (P/E/M)
Lauren Mann and the Fairly Odd Folk - Over Land and Sea (P/E/M)
SEU Worship - From The Vanguard Room (P/E/M)
Anberlin - Lowborn (P/E) 
This Wild Life - Clouded (P/E)
Emarosa - Versus Reimagined - EP (P)
Copeland - Ixora (P/E)
This Wild Life - Low Tides (P/E)
The Tenant - Is Listening/Visitors
The Lulls In Traffic - Rabbit in the Snare
Zealyn - Limbic System
Lydia - Run Wild
Jenny Dee - Dancing From a Distance
Speak Low - Nearsighted
Copeland - Blushing
Glaswing - I'm in the Checkout Line of My Life / Like Water on a Glass Table

References

External links
Thecopelandsite.com – official band website

American rock singers
American rock musicians
Record producers from Florida
Living people
1975 births
Singers from Orlando, Florida
21st-century American singers